Bengal War, also called campaign for the eastern Subahs, was waged by the Mughal imperial crown Prince Ali Gauhar (later known as Shah Alam II) so as to recapture Bengal from the British East India Company. Hostilities began in 1756 and ended in 1765.

Background

The English East India Company captured the territories of the Nawab of Bengal during the Seven Years' War and refused to pay taxation and tribute to the Great Moghul.

This annexation caused Shah Alam II to wage the Bengal War in 1759.

Although the Battle of Patna (1758), Battle of Chinsurah (1758) and Battle of Fort St. David (1758) were already fought.

Campaign
Shah Alam II was joined by Mir Qasim and most of the battles of the Bengal War took place around the city of Patna whose leaders Ramnarian was an ally of the East India Company was defeated in 1759.

In 1760 Shah Alam II was routed by John Caillaud, and Miran (son of Mir Jafar).

In 1761 Shah Alam II was also joined by the Rohillas, Durrani's and the Nawab Vizier (Grand Vizier) Shuja-ud-Daula who had been  a belligerent in the victory against the Maratha Confederacy at the Third Battle of Panipat.

Together they marched towards Murshidabad; compelled again to retreat in defeat. They then besieged Patna, but was beaten off by Capt. Knox’s force.

Shah Alam II was taken prisoner by Major Camac, 1761, in Bihar;
and allowed to retire to Awadh where he was crowned emperor again.

From there he planned further expeditions against Bengal Subah with the help of Nawab Shuja-ud-Daula.

But perhaps his most formidable subject during the Bengal War was Mir Qasim.

Together they formed a coalition led by the Great Moghul himself at the Battle of Buxar against the East India Company's Hector Munro of Novar.

Shah Alam II, who would later become a pensioner of the British East India Company in 1765.

Aftermath

Shah Alam II did manage to capture and hold Bihar before becoming a pensioner of the English.

John Caillaud had set three official seals to document expressing an intent to kill Shah Alam II, while he had the Mughal Crown Prince, allegations that Caillaud would later strongly deny.

The English East India Company waged a campaign to overthrow Shuja-ud-Daula.

Gallery

See also
 Shah Alam II
 Mir Jafar
 Great Bengal famine of 1770

References

Wars involving the Mughal Empire
Wars involving the British East India Company